Jalagam Vengal Rao Park (also known as JVR Park) is a park located in Banjara Hills in Hyderabad, Telangana, India. The park was named after the 5th Chief Minister of Andhra Pradesh – Jalagam Vengala Rao.

The park maintenance has been handed over to a private contractor, by the GHMC. Park now also hosts parties and musical soirees.

References

Parks in Hyderabad, India
Geography of Hyderabad, India
Tourist attractions in Hyderabad, India